The following is a list of notable events and releases that happened in 1999 in music in South Korea.

Debuting disbanded in 1999

Debuting

As One
Cleo
Click-B
Drunken Tiger
Fly to the Sky
g.o.d
Koyote
Rux
SM Town
T.T.Ma
YG Family

Solo debuts

Baek Ji-young
SKY
Kim Bum-soo
Kim Yeon-woo
Lee Juck
Lee Jung-hyun
Park Hyo-shin
Seomoon Tak
Shin Hae-chul
Lee Soo-young
You Hee-yeol

Disbanded groups
R.ef

Releases in 1999

January

February

March

April

May

June

July

August

September

October

November

December

See also
1999 in South Korea
List of South Korean films of 1999

References

 
South Korean music
K-pop